Rowland G. Garrett (born July 16, 1950) is an American former professional basketball player.

A 6'6" forward from Canton, Mississippi, Garrett played at Florida State University, and helped lead the Seminoles to the 1972 NCAA Men's Division I Basketball Championship, where the team lost to UCLA 81–76. Garrett was later selected by the Chicago Bulls with the 78th pick of the 1972 NBA Draft. He played sparingly with the Bulls as a rookie, but earned the respect of coach Dick Motta, and remained on the team for several years. During the first three games of the 1975–76 season, he tallied a combined 51 points and 21 rebounds, including a 22-point, 14 rebound performance in a victory over the Seattle SuperSonics on October 28, 1975.

On November 27, 1975, Garrett was traded to the Cleveland Cavaliers with Nate Thurmond for Steve Patterson and Eric Fernsten. After playing parts of two seasons with the Cavaliers, Garrett was then traded on January 14, 1977 with two first-round draft choices to the Milwaukee Bucks for Elmore Smith and Gary Brokaw. Garrett struggled to find playing time in Milwaukee, and was waived before the start of the 1977–78 season. His stint with the Bucks proved to be his last in the NBA. Over a five-year NBA career, he averaged 5.1 points per game and 2.3 rebounds per game.

Garrett was one of several former players who participated in the Chicago Bulls' 20th and 25th anniversary games in 1985 and 1990. As of 2007, he owned a chemical manufacturing company in his home state.

NBA career statistics

Regular season

|-
| align="left" | 1972–73
| align="left" | Chicago
| 35 || - || 6.0 || .441 || - || .677 || 1.7 || 0.2 || - || - || 3.6
|-
| align="left" | 1973–74
| align="left" | Chicago
| 41 || - || 9.1 || .370 || - || .656 || 1.7 || 0.3 || 0.1 || 0.2 || 3.8
|-
| align="left" | 1974–75
| align="left" | Chicago
| 70 || - || 16.9 || .481 || - || .794 || 3.5 || 0.6 || 0.3 || 0.2 || 7.6
|-
| align="left" | 1975–76
| align="left" | Chicago
| 14 || - || 23.1 || .435 || - || .864 || 5.4 || 0.5 || 0.6 || 0.3 || 10.9
|-
| align="left" | 1975–76
| align="left" | Cleveland
| 41 || - || 5.3 || .402 || - || .714 || 1.0 || 0.2 || 0.4 || 0.1 || 2.9
|-
| align="left" | 1976–77
| align="left" | Cleveland
| 29 || - || 7.4 || .430 || - || .818 || 1.4 || 0.2 || 0.2 || 0.1 || 3.4
|-
| align="left" | 1976–77
| align="left" | Milwaukee
| 33 || - || 11.6 || .452 || - || .793 || 2.2 || 0.6 || 0.4 || 0.2 || 4.7
|- class="sortbottom"
| style="text-align:center;" colspan="2"| Career
| 263 || - || 11.0 || .441 || - || .772 || 2.3 || 0.4 || 0.3 || 0.2 || 5.1
|}

Playoffs

|-
| align="left" | 1972–73
| align="left" | Chicago
| 1 || - || 1.0 || .000 || - || .000 || 0.0 || 0.0 || - || - || 0.0
|-
| align="left" | 1973–74
| align="left" | Chicago
| 2 || - || 3.0 || .000 || - || .000 || 0.5 || 0.0 || 0.0 || 0.0 || 0.0
|-
| align="left" | 1974–75
| align="left" | Chicago
| 12 || - || 11.9 || .375 || - || .500 || 2.4 || 0.3 || 0.3 || 0.3 || 3.7
|-
| align="left" | 1975–76
| align="left" | Cleveland
| 4 || - || 1.3 || .000 || - || .500 || 0.0 || 0.0 || 0.0 || 0.0 || 0.5
|- class="sortbottom"
| style="text-align:center;" colspan="2"| Career
| 19 || - || 8.2 || .350 || - || .500 || 1.6 || 0.2 || 0.2 || 0.2 || 2.4
|}

References

1950 births
Living people
African-American basketball players
American expatriate basketball people in Italy
American men's basketball players
Basketball players from Mississippi
Chicago Bulls draft picks
Chicago Bulls players
Cleveland Cavaliers players
Florida State Seminoles men's basketball players
Milwaukee Bucks players
People from Canton, Mississippi
Small forwards
21st-century African-American people
20th-century African-American sportspeople